Michael P. Hein (born July 20, 1965) is an American politician who served as the 1st County Executive of Ulster County, serving until February 10, 2019 after having first been elected on November 4, 2008. Prior to the creation of this position, the 2008 ratification by referendum of the Ulster County Charter, he was the Ulster County Administrator.

Early life, education and career
Hein was reared by his parents on their farm in Esopus, New York and attended school in New Paltz.  In 1987, he received a Bachelor of Arts in Business Administration with a special emphasis in Management from Eckerd College.

Political career
Hein became the deputy treasurer of Ulster County in 2003, and was appointed as county administrator in 2006.  The duties of that position have since been shifted to the purview of the county executive, a position which came into being in 2006 due to the passage of the first county charter.  Hein was elected to the position and assumed office in January 2009.

Hein cut spending by $6 million, through attrition and privatization, and provided a 0% tax increase for 2011  He has also promoted tourism initiatives in the county.

Clash with New York City officials
In the fall of 2010, the New York City Department of Environment Protection began releasing turbid water from the Ashokan Reservoir via a waste channel which feeds into Ulster County's Esopus Creek. The Esopus Creek became contaminated with turbid water causing major problems to local farmers and residents as well as potentially damaging the aquatic ecosystem. This action by the agency which oversees the watershed feeding New York City's drinking water drew the attention of environmental groups and Ulster County residents, as well as that of County Executive Hein and many other local leaders.

On Tuesday January 12, 2010, after 97 days of contaminated releases into the Esopus Creek, County Executive Hein announced Ulster County's intentions to file a lawsuit against New York City DEP. After enlisting the help of the New York State Department of Environmental Conservation and the New York State Attorney General's office, Hein brought an end to these releases and forced New York City DEP to pay for an independent damage assessment in order to evaluate the impact of their actions.

Catskill Mountain Railroad
In October 2013, Hein included in his budget an amount totaling $642,000 that was to be earned by taking up tracks in an unused section of an almost 40-mile long corridor leased to a local tourist train company, the Catskill Mountain Railroad. Later, Hein suggested that much of the corridor be converted to a rail trail while preserving segments for continued tourist train operations  In response, the railroad created a plan calling for both rail and trail throughout in the former Ulster and Delaware Railroad. In 2013, Ulster County issued the tourism train a "Notice to Cure" citing lease violations. The lease with the tourism train was supposed to end in May 2016, and Mr. Hein was working with the Ulster County Legislature and other entities to prepare for future uses of the corridor.

In the summer of 2016, it was announced that the Catskill Mountain Railroad would be allowed to continue its operations between Kingston and Hurley, as well as Phoenicia and Boiceville.  In late 2016, Mr. Hein denied the railroad the right to operate out of Phoenicia, and the County made that portion of the line available to the highest bidder shortly thereafter.  The railroad bid for another lease on the line but Rail Explorers Inc. came in higher and was allowed to restore and operate the line with their rail-based bicycle system.

Rail Explorers had put very little effort into restoring the line early on and missed their 2017 opening date, reportedly they will begin operating the line after Memorial Day 2018.  Many local communities are in disagreement the actions of the County and of the Rail Explorers.  One point of argument is the proposed parking lot and bus turn around in the small residential village of Cold Brook.  Many residents fear that riders may wonder throughout the neighborhood, trespass and damage private property, while waiting for a bus to arrive and pick them up to return them to Phoenicia, the Rail Explorer's base of operations.

The Catskill Mountain Railroad has a large amount of its equipment stored in Phoenicia, however much of it is stored on County-owned rail, the County has reportedly sued them for not removing their equipment from the property, the railroad has no way of moving the equipment off of County Property as Phoenicia is cut off from the rest of the United States' rail network, including the rest of the Catskill Mountain Railroad.  Currently, the Empire State Railway Museum is attempting to construct several storage tracks on their property for the railroad to store their equipment.  In January 2018, Ulster County oversaw the removal of a large portion of the line along the Ashokan Reservoir.  According to local sources, they removed the rail, but have not completely removed the contaminated ties, which raises an environmental issue due to the adjacent Ashokan Reservoir, which supplies drinking water to New York City, and Esopus Creek, both of which provide habitat for much wildlife, including a large population of bald eagles.

References

External links
County Executive Mike Hein Official County Government Site
Ulster County Alive

1965 births
Living people
People from Esopus, New York
County executives in New York (state)
People from Hurley, New York
New York (state) Democrats
New York (state) Republicans
Eckerd College alumni